Human trafficking in North Korea (Democratic People’s Republic of Korea or DPRK) extends to men, women, and children for the purpose of forced labour, and/or commercial sexual exploitation for the trafficker (source country).

Trafficking by type

Women and girls 
The most common form of trafficking involves North Korean women and girls forced into marriage or prostitution in China. Women and girls from North Korea migrate to China, often with the help of a facilitator, seeking food, work, freedom, and better life prospects. Trafficking networks of Korean-Chinese and North Koreans (usually men) operate along the China–North Korea border, reportedly working with Chinese and North Korean border guards to recruit women for marriage or prostitution in China.

North Korean women often pass through many hands, with multiple brokers involved in their trafficking. In some cases, friends, neighbors, and village acquaintances transfer them to traffickers. Some vulnerable North Korean women who make their own way to China are lured, drugged, or kidnapped by traffickers upon arrival. Others are offered jobs but are subsequently trafficked into involuntary servitude through forced marriages to Chinese men, often of Korean ethnicity, into forced prostitution in brothels, or the Internet sex industry. In the 1990s, the prices for women of varying ages was around $3,000 per child or woman. In 2014, the price was greatly reduced to as low as $200, as reported by Yeonmi Park of the One World Young Leaders summit.

Some are forced to serve as hostesses in nightclubs and karaoke bars. Many victims are unable to speak Chinese and are held as prisoners by their traffickers. If found by Chinese authorities, victims are deported back to North Korea where they may face harsh punishment, and may be subject to forced labor in labor camps. NGOs and researchers estimate that tens of thousands of undocumented North Koreans currently live in northeast China, and as many as 70 percent of them are women.

There is no reliable information on how many of these North Koreans are or have been trafficked, but their status in China as economic migrants who may be deported to North Korea makes them particularly vulnerable to trafficking. Chinese authorities cracked down on cross-border movement in advance of the 2008 Beijing Olympic Games and they seem to have continued strict enforcement throughout 2009. Reports indicate corruption involving North Korean border guards facilitating cross-border movement, particularly involving traffickers and professional border crossers.

Forced labor 

Within North Korea, forced labor is part of an established system of political repression. North Koreans do not have a choice in the jobs they work and are not free to change jobs at will; the North Korean government determines what work each citizen will have. From April to September 2009, the government initiated a “150-Day Battle” campaign to boost the economy by requiring increased work hours and production targets of citizens, and implementing government-imposed programs, such as road building and construction work. The country initiated a second “labor mobilization” campaign, the “100-Day Battle,” immediately after the initial “150-Day Battle.”

The North Korean government is directly involved in subjecting North Koreans to forced labor in prison camps. An estimated 150,000 to 200,000 persons are held in detention camps in remote areas of the country; many of these prisoners were not duly convicted of a criminal offense. In prison camps, all prisoners, including children, are subject to forced labor, including logging, mining, and farming for long hours under harsh conditions. Reports indicate that political prisoners endure severe conditions, including little food or medical care, and brutal punishments; many are not expected to survive. Many prisoners have fallen ill or died, due to harsh labor conditions, inadequate food, beatings, lack of medical care, and unhygienic conditions.

North Korean workers sent abroad 

The North Korean government recruits workers for bilateral contracts with foreign governments, including in Russia, countries in Africa, Central and Eastern Europe, East and Southeast Asia, including Mongolia, and the Middle East. There are credible reports that many North Korean workers sent abroad by the regime under these contracts are subjected to forced labor, with their movement and communications constantly under surveillance and restricted by North Korean government “minders.”

Credible reports state that they face threats of government reprisals against them or their relatives in North Korea if they attempt to escape or complain to outside parties. Worker salaries are deposited into accounts controlled by the North Korean government, which keeps most of the money, claiming fees for various “voluntary” contributions to government endeavors. Workers only receive a fraction of the money paid to the North Korean government for their work.

Tens of thousands of North Korean workers are estimated to be employed in Russian logging camps, where they reportedly have only two days of rest per year and face punishments when they fail to meet production targets. Wages of some North Korean workers employed in Russia reportedly were withheld until the laborers returned home, in a coercive tactic by North Korean authorities to compel their labor. North Korean workers at joint ventures with foreign investors within North Korea are employed under arrangements similar to those that apply to overseas contract workers.

Since Kim Jong-un became leader of North Korea in 2011, the number of workers sent abroad has increased rapidly in order to obtain foreign currency and bypass international sanctions. In 2012 it was estimated that  60–65,000 North Koreans had been sent abroad to work in more than 40 countries and in 2015 these workers were estimated to number 100,000. In 2016 North Korea earned GB£1.6 billion (about US$2.3 billion) a year from workers sent abroad worldwide according to one source and GB£1 billion (about US$1.3 billion) according to another source.

In response to North Korea’s launch of a ballistic missile in 2017, the U.N. Security Council has unanimously approved sanctions against North Korea, including the return home of all North Koreans working overseas within 24 months. In December 2019, some countries had still not met these obligations. The U.N Security Council has thus set a deadline of December 22nd 2019, when sanctions would take effect. However, it was reported that North Korea had found ways of circumventing the  sanctions and started using a loop hole that allowed tourist or student visas. The resolution forbids extending or providing workers visas, allowing North Korea to change the type of visa requested to student or travel visa. Reportedly, in 2018, hundreds of North Koreans were working in China under a trainee status.  Moreover, North Korea has been sending students abroad pretending they are part of an exchange student program, while they are spending most of the time working in different businesses.

North Korean government response 
The North Korean government does not fully comply with the minimum standards for the elimination of trafficking and is not making significant efforts to do so. The government has explicitly denied that human trafficking is a problem. Authorities do not differentiate between trafficking and other forms of illegal border crossing, and victims are punished for violation of migration laws. The government contributes to the problem of trafficking through its harsh restrictions on emigration and through its forced labor prison camps, where North Koreans live in conditions of servitude, receiving little food and little if any medical care.

Prosecution
The North Korean government made little, if any, efforts to combat trafficking in persons through law enforcement efforts over the period 2015–2016, and continued to severely restrict the movement of its citizens internally and across its borders. The North Korean government continues to deny the existence of trafficking as a problem. Little information is available on North Korea’s internal legal system. The country’s Penal Code prohibits crossing the border without permission; these laws are used against both traffickers and trafficking victims.

It is doubtful that North Korean laws are adequate to address trafficking. Article 150 of the Penal Code criminalizes inter alia the abduction, sale, or trafficking of children. Article 7 of the 1946 Law on Equality of the Sexes forbids trafficking in women. However, fair trials do not occur in North Korea. It is not made clear under what provisions of the law, if any, traffickers are prosecuted. Laws used to prosecute traffickers and trafficking victims are those that seek to limit all cross-border migration, including refugee outflows, and often end up harming victims.

Reports indicate that more restrictions have been imposed on leaving North Korea, and there are reports of more severe punishments being imposed on those who seek to leave the country and those who are forcibly returned. Reports by North Korean defectors include instances of the government punishing traffickers; however, NGO reports indicate that the “traffickers” may include activists or professional border crossers who assist North Koreans voluntarily leaving for China. There were no known trafficking prosecutions or convictions during the reporting period.

Protection
The North Korean government does not make any known attempts to identify individuals as victims of trafficking or assist victims of trafficking. On the contrary, victims undergo severe abuse by the regime if caught attempting to cross the border or if deported back to North Korea by the Chinese government. While authorities screened repatriated North Koreans for contacts with South Koreans and exposure to South Korean cultural influences, they did not make a distinction between trafficking victims and illegal immigrants.

North Koreans forcibly repatriated by Chinese authorities, including a significant number of women believed to be trafficking victims, are sent to prison camps, where they may be subject to forced labor, torture, sexual abuse by prison guards, or other severe punishment. Repatriated victims who are suspected of having become pregnant with a child of possible Chinese paternity may be subject to forced abortions and infanticide; reports indicate that prison authorities may kill babies born to repatriated victims while in prison. The government did not ensure that trafficking victims are not penalized for unlawful acts committed as a direct result of being trafficked.

Internal conditions in North Korea prompt many North Koreans to flee the country, making them particularly vulnerable to human traffickers. North Korea continues to ban the existence of indigenous NGOs, and there are no international NGOs in the country that work to prevent trafficking or assist trafficking victims. North Korea is not a party to the 2000 UN TIP Protocol.

See also
Human rights in North Korea
North Korea's illicit activities

References

 
North Korea
North Korea
Human rights abuses in North Korea